Samuel Boldwin Sentine Baynes ( – 29 December 2014), also known as just Sentini, was a Honduran football goalkeeper.

Club career
Born in La Ceiba, Sentine was an airplane pilot before turning to football with Atlético Indio. He later moved to Honduran giants Olimpia.

He was regarded as one of Olimpia's best goalkeepers in history, winning the 1972 CONCACAF Champions' Cup with the club.

International career
Sentine represented Honduras national team in 1 FIFA World Cup qualification match.

Retirement and death
He retired from football at 47 in 1995. In January 2011, Sentine suffered a stroke. He died from Alzheimer's disease in December 2014.

References

1948 births
2014 deaths
People from La Ceiba
Association football goalkeepers
Honduran footballers
Honduras international footballers
C.D. Olimpia players